General  Clement Alexander Edwards CB (12 November 1812 – 29 July 1882) was a British Army officer who became colonel of the 2nd (The Queen's Royal) Regiment of Foot.

Military career
Born in London, Edwards was son of Colonel C. M. Edwards, military secretary to the Duke of York. Educated at the Royal Military College, Sandhurst, he was commissioned as an ensign in the 31st Regiment of Foot on 11 June 1829. He saw action with the 18th Regiment of Foot at the Battle of Canton in March 1841, the Battle of Amoy in August 1841, the Battle of Chapu in May 1841, the Battle of Woosung in June 1842 and the Battle of Chinkiang in July 1842 during the First Opium War. Edwards became Assistant Quartermaster-General in China in December 1842 and then saw action in Burma in Autumn 1851 during the Second Anglo-Burmese War. He also took part in the Siege of Sevastopol in Winter 1854 during the Crimean War and commanded a brigade at Mhow during the Indian Rebellion. He went on to be Inspecting Field Officer in Bristol in April 1866 and Inspector-General of Recruiting at the War Office in July 1867.
 
Edwards became colonel of the 2nd (The Queen's Royal) Regiment of Foot on 15 March 1877 and colonel of the 18th Regiment of Foot on 25 March 1877. He died on 29 July 1882 at Leeson House, Blackheath, England.

References

|-

1812 births
1882 deaths
East Surrey Regiment officers
British Army personnel of the Second Anglo-Burmese War
British military personnel of the First Opium War
British military personnel of the Indian Rebellion of 1857
British Army generals
Companions of the Order of the Bath
Graduates of the Royal Military College, Sandhurst
Military personnel from London
British military personnel of the Crimean War